Ludmila Tsukanova is a former Ukrainian football goalkeeper, who played for Donchanka Azov in the Russian Championship.

References

1982 births
Living people
Ukrainian women's footballers
WFC Zhytlobud-1 Kharkiv players
WFC Donchanka Donetsk players
Expatriate women's footballers in Russia
Women's association football goalkeepers
FC Energy Voronezh players
Ukrainian expatriate sportspeople in Russia
Ukrainian expatriate sportspeople in Azerbaijan